Aloe ballii is a species of plant in the family Asphodelaceae, subfamily Asphodeloideae. It is found in Mozambique and Zimbabwe.

References

ballii
Flora of Mozambique
Flora of Zimbabwe
Endangered flora of Africa
Taxonomy articles created by Polbot